Toytown was a BBC radio series for children, broadcast for Children's Hour on the Home Service. The plays were based on a set of puppets created by S. G. Hulme Beaman, who also wrote the stories for the series. The first Toytown plays were broadcast in 1929, and the pool of stories was re-used until the end of Children's Hour. There were 31 plays in all.

The series starred Larry the Lamb, the central character, and his clever sidekick, Dennis the Dachshund. In each story a misunderstanding, often arising from a device created by the inventor, Mr. Inventor, occurs which involves Ernest the Policeman, the disgruntled Mr Growser the Grocer and the Mayor.

In 1956, a puppet television series was broadcast, with Rosemary Miller as Larry the Lamb, Peter Hawkins, her husband as Ernest the Policeman (the two met here) and Roy Skelton as Mr Growser. Only Peter reprised his role in the 1972 series.

The opening music was "The Parade of the Tin Soldiers" by Leon Jessel.

Characters
 Larry the Lamb - The protagonist and best friend of Dennis. Larry and Dennis are very mischievous and the closest thing Toytown has to hoodlums. On one occasion they vandalized the mayor's statue, and on another they convinced everyone there was a dragon on the loose (which by coincidence there really was).
 Dennis the Dachshund. Clever friend of Larry. He speaks with a strong German accent and uses German word-order in his sentences. He is good at turning barrels and spit wheels. He dreams of being an Alsatian and particularly dislikes being called a "sausage dog".
 Mr. Mayor - Toytown's chief official. He is rather pompous and has had a statue of himself placed in the town square. He has an inferiority complex about his short stature, and on one occasion asked the magician to make him "big". (The magician misheard him and turned him into a pig.)
 Ernest the Policeman - Keeps "law and order" but rarely ever arrests anyone. He is always threatening to write down people's names and addresses in his notebook. He considers himself the mayor's deputy, and on one occasion set himself up as "mayor" while the real mayor was away on a rest cure.
 Mr. Inventor - A brilliant engineer, capable of making almost anything. On one occasion however he was stumped at how to make an engine for the Mayor's car, and asked Larry and Dennis to provide the propulsion. He suffered the derision of Mr. Growser when this deception was revealed.
 Mr. Noah - Keeps a menagerie of animals in his "Ark".
 Mr. Growser - A disagreeable old gentleman who is always finding things to complain about - usually the behavior of his fellow citizens. His favourite phrase is "It's disgraceful, it ought not to be allowed!"
 The Magician - A sorcerer who makes a specialty of granting people's wishes. In one story Larry becomes his apprentice.

Radio plays
The first radio performances were as follows:
"How Wireless Came to Toytown": 29 Nov 1929
"The Sea Voyage": 27 Dec 1929
"The Enchanted Ark": 2 Jan 1930
"The Arkville Dragon": 30 Jan 1930
"Larry the Plumber": 18 Feb 1930
"Toy Town Treasure": 12 Mar 1930
"The Great Toy Town Mystery! Who Was Guilty?" 3 Apr 1930
"The Extraordinary Affair of Ernest the Policeman": 1 May 1930
"The Portrait of the Mayor": 6 June 1930
"The Great Toy-Town War": 14 Oct 1930
"The Disgraceful Affair at Mrs. Goose's": 14 Nov 1930
"The Showing Up of Larry The Lamb": 9 Dec 1930
"The Kidnapping of Father Christmas": 23 Dec 1930
"The Babes in the Wood": 13 Jan 1931
"The Start of the Treasure Hunt": 3 Feb 1931
"In Which Mr. Growser's Worst Fears Are Realised": 19 Feb 1931
"The Wreck of the Toytown Belle", part 1: 3 Mar 1931
"The Wreck of the Toytown Belle", part 2: 19 Mar 1931
"Toy Town Goes West": 31 Mar 1931
"Mr. Noah's Holiday": 21 Apr 1931
"Pistols for Two": 12 May 1931
"Dreadful Doings at Ark Street": 9 June 1931
"Disgraceful Doings in Ark Street": 1 Sept 1931
"Frightfulness at the Theatre Royal": 22 Sept 1931
"Golf (Toytown Rules)": 13 Oct 1931
"Tea for Two": 3 Nov 1931
"Mr. Growser Moves": 1 Dec 1931
"A Toytown Christmas Party": 22 Dec 1931
"The Brave Deed of Ernest the Policeman": 2 Feb 1932
"The Conversion of Mr. Growser": 23 Feb 1932
"Dirty Work at the Dog & Whistle": 16 Aug 1932 (possibly a repeat of "The Kidnapping of Father Christmas")

Television
A stop-motion television series using titles such as Stories from Toytown Featuring Larry the Lamb was broadcast on ITV between 1972 and 1973. Twenty-six of Hulme Beaman's stories were adapted for television by his friend Hendrik Baker. These were released on video by Inter Ocean Video over five volumes in 1981 and 1982. Only Peter Hawkins reprised his role from the 1956 series, as Patsy Blower voiced Larry. 
  "Toytown Goes West"
  "The Tale of Captain Brass the Pirate"
  "The Extraordinary Affair of Ernest the Policeman"
  "The Disgraceful Business at Mrs. Goose's"
  "Golf (Toytown Rules)"
  "The Arkville Dragon"
  "The Tale of the Inventor"
  "The Tale of the Magician"
  "The Theatre Royal"
  "The Toytown Treasure"
  "Tea for Two"
  "Mr. Noah's Holiday"
  "The Toytown Mystery"
  "A Portrait of the Mayor"
  "Pistols for Two"
  "How the Wireless Came to Toytown"
  "The Brave Deed of Ernest the Policeman"
  "The Tale of Ernest the Policeman"
  "The Showing Up of Larry the Lamb"
  "Larry the Plumber"
  "The Mayor's Sea Voyage"
  "Dreadful Doings in Ark Street"
  "The Great Toytown War"
  "Mr. Growser Moves"
  "Mr. Mayor"
  "Dirty Work at the Dog & Whistle"

See also 
The Noddy stories, written from 1949 to 1963 for children by author Enid Blyton, take place in a location called Toyland.

References

External links
 Comprehensive article about Toytown at ukonline

BBC Home Service programmes
British children's radio programmes
British television shows featuring puppetry
ITV children's television shows
Fictional sheep
1972 British television series debuts
1974 British television series endings